Lakeeren is a 1954 Hindi Bollywood film starring Ashok Kumar, Nalini Jaywant in lead roles, music by Hafiz Khan & Lyrics by Shevan Rizvi.

Plot

Songs

Cast
 Ashok Kumar   
 Nalini Jaywant   
 Pran   
 Durga Khote   
 Ramayan Tiwari   
 Cukoo   
 Sulochana Latkar   
 Yakub   
 Kamal

References

External links
 Lakeeren at the Internet Movie Database

1954 films
1950s Hindi-language films
Indian drama films
1954 drama films
Indian black-and-white films